Rhino! is a 1964 American action film directed by Ivan Tors and written by Art Arthur and Arthur Weiss. The film stars Harry Guardino, Shirley Eaton, Robert Culp, Harry Makela and George Korelin. The film was released on May 20, 1964, by Metro-Goldwyn-Mayer.

Plot

A humane zoologist, Dr. Jim Hanlon, who deplores the poaching of African rhinoceros, is unaware that the man he is guiding on safari, Alec Burnett, is a hunter intending to capture two rare white rhino to sell. Edith Arleigh is a nurse romantically involved with Burnett, whose hardened attitude toward jungle life softens when he is bitten by a cobra and Hanlon has to save his life.

Cast 
Harry Guardino as Alec Burnett
Shirley Eaton as Miss Arleigh
Robert Culp as Dr. Hanlon
Harry Makela as Jopo 
George Korelin as Haragay

See also
List of American films of 1964
Ian Player - South African international conservationist

References

External links 
 

1964 films
American action films
1960s action films
Metro-Goldwyn-Mayer films
Films scored by Lalo Schifrin
Films about rhinoceroses
Films shot in South Africa
1960s English-language films
1960s American films